The Honda Z50A is a small motorcycle with a  single-cylinder four-stroke overhead cam engine and a semi-automatic transmission. It was made by Honda from 1968 to 1978 and it was the second generation of the Z50 Series of minibikes.

Z50A designs 
The 1968-1971 Z50As were known as the "Hard Tail" because of their lack of rear shock absorbers. 1968 was also called a K0, a 1969-1970 is called a K1 and a 1970-71 are referred to as K2s. Rear shock absorbers were added to the Z50A in 1972 and it was referred to as a K3.

History
The 1968 sometimes referred to as the "High Bar" or the "Slantguard", was the first of the Z50 series to be released to the American market. The bikes had white handgrips and 8 inch wheels. They came in with a two tone paint job.

In 1969, Honda released the K1 which added street legal lighting. Lower handlebars were fitted on the 1969/1970 K1 "short tail" as well as a license plate mount.

In 1972, after frame cracking became a growing issue, Honda incorporated rear suspension on the bike. The Z50A "Soft Tail" remained on the American market until after model year 1978, when it was replaced by the Z50R. In Europe and Japan, the Z50A was renamed the Z50J in 1973, and remained on the market until 1999.

See also
 List of scooter manufacturers
 Minibike
 Pocketbike
 Pit bike
 Types of motorcycles

References

Z50A
Minibikes
Motorcycles introduced in 1968